Campocolinus is a genus of birds in the francolin group of the family Phasianidae. They are found in Sub-Saharan Africa.

Species
It contains three species, all of which were formerly classified in Peliperdix. The species are:

References 

Campocolinus
Bird genera